Alice Matteucci (born 29 September 1995) is an Italian former tennis player.

She has won six singles and 16 doubles titles on the ITF Circuit. On 22 February 2016, she reached her best singles ranking of world No. 319. On 26 October 2015, she peaked at No. 145 in the doubles rankings.

Matteucci was given a wildcard for the Palermo Ladies Open, where she made her WTA Tour main-draw debut in July 2013, losing to Estrella Cabeza Candela in straight sets.

She made her debut for the Italy Fed Cup team in February 2014, in the World Group first-round tie away to the United States in Cleveland. Partnering Nastassja Burnett in doubles, she lost the dead rubber in straight sets to Lauren Davis and Madison Keys.

ITF finals

Singles: 10 (6–4)

Doubles: 35 (16–19)

Fed Cup participation

Doubles

References

External links

 
 
 

1995 births
Living people
Sportspeople from Pescara
Italian female tennis players
21st-century Italian women